Luigi Cervi (3 May 1901 – 3 January 1974), better known as Gino Cervi, was an Italian actor. He was best known for portraying Peppone in a series of comedies based on the character Don Camillo (1952-1965), and police detective Jules Maigret on the television series Le inchieste del commissario Maigret (1964-1972).

Life and career
Cervi was born in Bologna as Luigi Cervi. His father was Antonio Cervi, a theatre critic for Il Resto del Carlino. His family held close ties to the town of Casalbuttano ed Uniti, where the elder Cervi would eventually be buried. 

He was best known for his role of Giuseppe Bottazzi ("Peppone"), the Communist mayor in the Don Camillo movies of the 1950s and the 1960s. He shared great understanding and friendship with co-star Fernandel during the 15 years playing their respective roles in Don Camillo movies. He was a stage actor, particularly known for his interpretations of Shakespeare, and co-founded the Teatro Eliseo's stable company with Paolo Stoppa and Rina Morelli in 1939.

Toward the end of his career he played Commissioner Maigret for eight years in the Italian TV adaptation of the series of crime novels by Georges Simenon, Le inchieste del commissario Maigret (1964–1972), during which he also starred in a spin-off movie Maigret a Pigalle (1966), produced by his son Tonino Cervi.

Cervi was also a voice actor, and dubbed into Italian the films of Laurence Olivier (Henry V, 1944; Hamlet, 1948; Richard III, 1955), Orson Welles, Clark Gable (It Happened One Night, 1934), and James Stewart (Harvey, 1950). He dubbed Alec Guinness' voice in the Italian version of Brother Sun, Sister Moon (1972) and Charles Boyer in Lucky to Be a Woman (1956).

Personal life 
In 1928, Cervi married actress Nini Gordini and they had a son, Tonino Cervi. He later became the grandfather of actress Valentina Cervi and producer Antonio Levesi Cervi.

He was initiated to the Italian Scottish Rite Freemasonry in the Lodge "Palingenesi" (Rome, 1946) and later he joined the Lodge "Galvani" in Bologna.

As a young adult, Cervi was a supporter of the Fascist Party, in large part because of his Catholic faith, and participated in the March on Rome. His political alignment changed during World War II, when he openly denounced Fascism and far-right politics in general. He supported the Christian Democrats during the 1968 general election, and later joined the Italian Liberal Party, winning an election as councilor for the Lazio region.

Death 
Cervi died in Punta Ala in 1974.

Selected filmography 

 The Blue Fleet (1932)
 Frontiere (1934)
 The Two Sergeants (1936) - Commander Federico Martelli / Sergeant Guglielmo Salvoni
 Aldebaran (1936) - Cmdr. Corrado Valeri
 Amore (1936) - Paolo Venieri
 Gli uomini non sono ingrati (1937) - Ferencz Korvat
 I Want to Live with Letizia (1938) - Bebe
 L'argine (1938) - Zvanì
 Ettore Fieramosca (1938) - Ettore Fieramosca
 Inventiamo l'amore (1938) - Carlo Morelli
 The Sons of the Marquis Lucera (1939) - Ermanno
 Un'avventura di Salvator Rosa (1939) - Salvador Rosa, il "Formica"
 The Sinner (1940) - Alberto
 A Romantic Adventure (1940) - Luigi
 Eternal Melodies (1940) - Wolfgang Amadeus Mozart
 Il sogno di tutti (1940) - Baby's fathe
 The Iron Crown (1941) - King Sedemondo of Kindaor
 The Betrothed (1941) - Renzo Tramaglino
 L'ultimo addio (1942) - Doctor Gino Landi
 The Queen of Navarre (1942) - Carlo Vº
 Don Cesare di Bazan (1942) - Don Cesare of Bazan
 Torrents of Spring (1942) - Francesco
 Quarta pagina (1942) - Former inmate
 Four Steps in the Clouds (1942) - Paolo Bianchi
 Gente dell'aria (1943) - Captain Pietro Sandri
 Sad Loves (1943) - Giulio Scarli
 T'amerò sempre (1943) - Mario Fabbrini
 The Innkeeper (1944) - The poet
 Vivere ancora (1945)
 Quartetto pazzo (1945) - Roberto
 What a Distinguished Family (1945) - Michele Montischi
 My Widow and I (1945) - Mr. Guglielmi
 His Young Wife (1945) - Knight Commander Francesco Battilocchio
 Un uomo ritorna (1946) - Sergio Tibaldi
 Malìa (1946) - Don Alfonso
 L'angelo e il diavolo (1946) - Giulio Serra
 Black Eagle (1946) - Kirila Petrovic
 Umanità (1946)
 Crime News (1947)
 Fury (1947) - Oreste
 Daniele Cortis (1947) - Elena's husband
 I miserabili (1948) - Jean Valjean
 Anna Karenina (1948) - Enrico
 Fabiola (1949) - Quadratus
 William Tell (1949) - William Tell
 The Flame That Will Not Die (1949) - Luigi Manfredi
 The Bride Can't Wait (1949) - Anselmo Brunelli
 Yvonne of the Night (1949) - Colonnel Baretti
 Il cielo è rosso (1950) 
 The Cliff of Sin (1950) - Silvano
 Women Without Names (1950) - MP Sergeant Pietro Zanini
 Story of a Love Affair (1950)
 Red Seal (1950)
 Il caimano del Piave (1951) - Colonel of Torrebruna
 The Forbidden Christ (1951) - The Sexton
 Cameriera bella presenza offresi... (1951) - Filiberto 'Berto' Morucchi
 O.K. Nerone (1951) - Nero
 Hello Elephant (1952) - Narrator
 Don Camillo (1952) - Giuseppe 'Peppone' Bottazzi
 Wife For a Night (1952) - Count D'Origo
 Three Forbidden Stories (1952) - Prof. Aragona (Third segment)
 The Queen of Sheba (1952) - King Solomon of Jerusalem
 La scogliera del peccato (1952)
 The Lady Without Camelias (1953) - Ercole 'Ercolino' Borra
 Terminal Station (1953) - Police commissioner
 The Return of Don Camillo (1953) - Giuseppe 'Peppone' Bottazzi
 Nero and the Burning of Rome (1953) - Nero
 Les Trois Mousquetaires (1953) - Porthos
 The Lady of the Camellias (1953) - Monsieur Duval
 Cavallina storna (1953) - Ruggero Pascoli
 Royal Affairs in Versailles (1954) - Cagliostro
 Maddalena (1954) - Don Vincenzo
 Cardinal Lambertini (1954) - Cardinal Lambertini
 A Free Woman (1954) - Knight Commander Massimo Marchi
 La grande avventura (1954)
 Farewell, My Beautiful Lady (1954) - Count Riccardo Salluzzo
 Frou-Frou (1955) - Prince Vladimir Bilinsky
 Non c'è amore più grande (1955)
 Don Camillo's Last Round (1955) - Giuseppe 'Peppone' Bottazzi
 Il coraggio (1955) - Comm. Aristide Paoloni
 Wild Love (1956) - Sor Cesare
 Guardia, guardia scelta, brigadiere e maresciallo (1956) - Marshall
 Beatrice Cenci (1956) - Francesco Cenci
 Wives and Obscurities (1956) - John Cattabriga
 Desert Warrior (1957) - Ibrahim
 Trapped in Tangier  (1957) - Prof. Bolevasco
 Le belle dell'aria (1957) - Don Fogazza
 Amore e chiacchiere (Salviamo il panorama) (1958) - Paseroni
 El pasado te acusa (1958) - Comisario
  (1958) - Vitalis
 The Naked Maja  (1958) - King Carlos IV of Spain
 Nel Segno di Roma (1959) - Aurelianus - Emperor of Rome
 Le Grand Chef (1959) - Paulo
 The Black Chapel (1959) - Police commissioner Ferrari
 Vacations in Majorca (1959) - André Breton
 The Employee (1960) - King Lear (uncredited)
 David and Goliath (1960) - King Saul (voice, uncredited)
 Siege of Syracuse (1960) - Gerome
 Mistress of the World (1960) - Professor Johanson
 Long Night in 1943  (1960) - Carlo Aretusi aka "Sciagura"
 Le olimpiadi dei mariti (1960) - Director of the newspaper
 Femmine di lusso  (1960) - Comm. Lemeni, Ugo's father
 The Revolt of the Slaves  (1960) - Fabio
 Un figlio d'oggi (1961) - Andrea
 The Joy of Living (1961) - Olinto Fossati
 Don Camillo: Monsignor (1961) - Giuseppe 'Peppone' Bottazzi
 The Orderly (1961) - Major Penna
 Ten Italians for One German (1962) - Duke Alfonso di San Severino
 Roaring Years (1962) - Podestà Salvatore Acquamano
 La monaca di Monza (1962) - Cardinale Borromeo
 Le Crime ne paie pas (1962) - L'inquisiteur (segment "Le masque")
 The Changing of the Guard (1962) - Mario Vinicio
 Avventura al motel (1963) - Knight Commander
 The Shortest Day (1963) - Colonel Daini
 The Eye of the Needle (1963) - D'Angelo - lawyer
 Gli onorevoli (1963) - Senator Rossani Braschi
 Le Bon Roi Dagobert (1963) - Le ministre saint-eloi
  (1964) - Botta
 Becket (1964) - the Cardinal / Cardinal Zambelli
 Don Camillo in Moscow (1965) - Giuseppe 'Peppone' Bottazzi
 Maigret a Pigalle (1966) - Jules Maigret
 Gli altri, gli altri... e noi (1967)
  (1972) - Don Lino
 Uccidere in silenzio (1972) - Nono Devoto
 I racconti romani di una ex novizia (1973) - (final film role)

Bibliography
 Mauro Manciotti, Un attore per amico. Omaggio a Gino Cervi, Comune di Borgio Verezzi (SV), Borgio Verezzi 1999
 Andrea Maioli, Rino Maenza, Cervi 100. Peppone, Maigret e gli altri, Medianova, Bologna 2001
 Andrea Derchi, Marco Biggio, Gino Cervi: attore protagonista del '900, ERGA Edizioni, Genova 2002, 
 Riccardo F. Esposito, Don Camillo e Peppone. Cronache cinematografiche dalla Bassa Padana 1951-1965, Le Mani - Microart's, Recco, 2008,

Notes

External links 
 
 Auf den Spuren von Don Camillo und Peppone
 Cervi's filmography

1901 births
1974 deaths
Italian male film actors
Actors from Bologna
Nastro d'Argento winners
20th-century Italian male actors
Italian male television actors
Italian male voice actors
Burials at the Cimitero Flaminio
Italian male stage actors
Christian Democracy (Italy) politicians
Italian fascists